A Bremer wall, or T-wall, is a  portable, steel-reinforced concrete blast wall of the type used for blast protection throughout Iraq and Afghanistan. 

The Bremer barrier resembles the smaller  Jersey barrier, which has been used widely for vehicle traffic control on coalition military bases in Iraq and Afghanistan. Unlike the Jersey barrier, which has sloped sides at the base, some Texas and Alaska barriers have a rectangular ledge base, usable as a bench for sitting or resting and approximately knee-high for a typical adult.

Etymology 
These T-shaped walls were originally developed by the Israelis in the Israeli West Bank barrier. The term "T-wall" has been used commonly, due to the wall's cross-sectional shape resembling an inverted letter "T".

The name is believed to have originated from L. Paul Bremer of the Coalition Provisional Authority, who was the Director of Reconstruction and Humanitarian Assistance for post-war Iraq, following the Iraq War of 2003, in the early years of the Iraq War.

Uses 
T-walls have proven to be an effective weapon on the modern battlefield. Often made of a special type of concrete that is designed to withstand the impact of explosions and reinforced with steel bars and is significantly thicker and heavier than traditional concrete, they are primarily used to provide protection against improvised explosive devices (IEDs), rocket attacks, and other forms of indirect fire. As a result, Bremer walls are capable of stopping or deflecting even the most powerful explosive devices. Much like hesco bastions, t-wall barriers were commonly used as perimeter fortifications of forward operating bases during the War on terror.

During the Iraq war, US forces found concrete to be their most effective weapon to reduce violence and protect the local population from sectarian violence while impeding the movement of insurgents. At an average cost of $600 per wall in the mid-2000s, billions of dollars were spent constructing and placing these concrete fortifications throughout the country, to wall off whole roads and neighborhoods and to create what was dubbed “safe communities.” Walling off troubled neighborhoods and maintaining the barriers became the daily mission for many security forces. In Baghdad's Sadr City district, for example, over 30 miles of twelve-foot-tall concrete T-wall barriers to create what was dubbed “safe communities.”

T-Wall Art 

In addition to offering protection, T-walls became a popular medium for soldiers and civilians to express themselves with graffiti and folk art much like the aircraft nose art of previous conflicts.” Many military units paint the T-walls with their insignia, colors, mottos, mascots, that ranged in a wide array of quality from simple stencil art and graffiti writing to elaborate memorials and murals. Much like the aircraft nose art traditions Many of the murals painted on the T-walls show the pride soldiers have in their unit or protest messages by civilians. So prevalent were T-walls to the conflicts in Iraq and Afghanistan, that customized miniature T-walls were routinely offered as a form of trench art souvenirs going away gifts to remind all of the surroundings.

References

External links

In the Business of Blast Walls, Saturday, April 5, 2008. Includes many photos.

Fortifications by type
Protective barriers
Types of wall